Katalin Divós (born 11 May 1974 in Szombathely) is a female hammer thrower from Hungary. Her personal best is 70.79 metres, achieved in May 2001 in Doha. Divós was suspended for doping between July 2001 and July 2003.

Achievements

See also
List of sportspeople sanctioned for doping offences

References

External links

1974 births
Living people
Hungarian female hammer throwers
Hungarian sportspeople in doping cases
Athletes (track and field) at the 2000 Summer Olympics
Athletes (track and field) at the 2004 Summer Olympics
Olympic athletes of Hungary
Doping cases in athletics
Sportspeople from Szombathely
20th-century Hungarian women
21st-century Hungarian women